The 2004 FIBA U16 European Championship Division C was held in Andorra la Vella, Andorra, from 20 to 24 July 2004. Five teams participated in the competition.

Participating teams
 (hosts)

Standings

2003–04 in European basketball
FIBA Europe Under-16 Championship
July 2004 sports events in Europe
FIBA U16 European Championship Division C